Spathula is a genus of dugesiid triclad. Its species are found in Australia and New Zealand.

Until 1977, Spathula was ranked as a subgenus of Dugesia.

Description
Specimens of this genus have a triangular head.

Species
The following species are recognised in the genus Spathula<ref>*Tyler S, Schilling S, Hooge M, and Bush LF (comp.) (2006-2012) Turbellarian taxonomic database. Version 1.7  Database </ref>

 Spathula agelaea Hay & Ball, 1979
 Spathula alba Allison, 1997
 Spathula camara Ball, 1977
 Spathula dittae Ball & Tran, 1979
 Spathula foeni Ball, 1977
 Spathula fontinalis (Nurse, 1950)
 Spathula gourbaultae Ball, 1977
 Spathula limicola (Nurse, 1950)
 Spathula miserabile Sluys & Grant, 2006
 Spathula musculosa Sluys & Grant, 2006
 Spathula neara Ball, 1977
 Spathula ochyra Ball & Tran, 1979
 Spathula schauinslandi (Neppi, 1904)
 Spathula simplex Sluys & Grant, 2006
 Spathula truculenta Ball, 1977
 Spathula trunculata Ball, 1977
 Spathula tryssa'' Ball, 1977

References

Dugesiidae
Rhabditophora genera